This is a list of islands of Hungary.  Notable islands, islets, and rocks are listed by region.

Danube

In Esztergom
Körtvélyesi-sziget
Nyáros-sziget
Csitri sziget
Prímás-sziget
Helemba-sziget
Dédai-sziget
Törpe-sziget

In Budapest (from north to south)
 Palotai-sziget (in fact, it's a peninsula today)
 Népsziget (connected to the above, but mostly surrounded by water)
 Óbudai-sziget (a.k.a. Hajógyári-sziget, see also Sziget Festival)
 Margitsziget (or Margit-sziget)
 Háros-sziget
 Csepel-sziget (only its tip belongs to Budapest)
 Molnár-sziget

Outside Budapest

 Czuczor-sziget
 Sport-sziget
 Haraszti-sziget
 Taksony-sziget
 Mohácsi-sziget
 Szentendrei-sziget
 Dunasziget
 Pap-sziget
 Lupa-sziget
 Cseke-sziget
 Gödi-sziget
 Domariba-sziget
 Martuska-sziget
 Szúnyog-sziget
 Kőhidi-sziget
 Petőfi-sziget
 Felsőzátonyi-sziget
 Szalki-sziget
 Nagy-Pandúr-sziget
 Öreg-sziget
 Palánki-sziget
 Veránka-sziget
 Szigetköz

Tisza
 Kácsa-sziget
 Alcsi-sziget
 Farkas-sziget
 Buláti-sziget
 Aranysziget
 Kis-Tisza-sziget
 Korom-sziget

See also
 List of islands

References

Hungary
 
Islands